Rob Wright is an American television writer and producer. His credits include such titles as “Lethal Weapon,” “The Librarians,” “Ash vs. Evil Dead,” “Grimm,” “Drop Dead Diva,” “Las Vegas,” “Crossing Jordan,” “Charmed,” “Law & Order,” and “Walker Texas Ranger.” 

A graduate of Yale University (BA) and USC's School of Cinema/Television (MFA), Wright has sold movies and created pilots, including the 2012/2013 drama “The Mob Doctor,” where he served as Executive Producer and Co-Showrunner, and NBC's Delivery.

Currently, Wright serves as Executive Producer/Co-Showrunner of The CW's series “Supergirl.”   

He was born in New York City and raised in Los Angeles. He now resides with his wife, Kristin Newman, and three children in the surfing-and-mountain-biking-friendly community of Santa Monica, CA.

References

External links
 

American television producers
American television writers
Living people
Place of birth missing (living people)
Year of birth missing (living people)